Vladimír Večtomov (February 2, 1946 – October 12, 2015) was a Czech classical guitarist. He concluded his studies in Mexico with a concert at Palacio de Bellas Artes in Mexico City. In 1973 he performed as a soloist in Bergen, Norway, with Slovak Chamber Orchestra. In 1974 he performed Bach's catalog in London to notable acclaim. From 1972 to 1976 he was a professor at Prague Conservatory.

 In 1970, on return to Czechoslovakia from Mexico, Večtomov formed Prague String Duo with his brother, cellist Saša Večtomov. The duo's many appearances outside Czechoslovakia—filling concert halls in the USSR, USA, Great Britain, Mexico, Norway, Portugal and many other countries—established them internationally. A salient feature of the duo's repertory was its focus on Iberian composers, whom they favored owing to the national character of the accompanying instrument and the fact that Vladimír had for years studied on a Mexican government scholarship under the tutelage of guitarist Prof. Manuel López Ramos in Mexico City.

In addition to old masters (e.g., Haydn, Eccles, Maria Theresia von Paradis), and modern and sometimes local ones (Granados, Janáček), the brothers Večtomov performed music by contemporary composers including their father, Prof. Ivan Večtomov, who, moreover, wrote all of their arrangements. According to Mexican journalist Isabel Farfán Cano, Janáček's Fairy Tale was a brilliant staple of the duo's concert programs. Further, writes Cano of a particular concert in 1976, "the harmony of both instruments in creating sound coloration and tones was complemented by technical security, gradual and protruding."

In 1982 Večtomov accepted an invitation to join the faculty of Keski-Suomen konservatorio (later renamed Jyväskylän ammattikorkeakoulu), in Jyväskylä, Finland, where he continued to teach until 1998. He then returned to Prague and taught at Základní Umělecká Škola Lounských.

Phonograph recordings of Večtomov have been issued on the Supraphon, Panton, and Melodiya labels. In 2015 the Czech music label Uneventful Records released a CD and digital album of Prague String Duo archive recordings.

Misc.
Večtomov's conservatory days are recounted in fellow pupil František Ringo Čech's 1983 memoir Z mého života.

His instrument was a Masaru Kohno Luthier, Tokyo, Model 20 1974 (string length: 660mm).

Death
On October 12, 2015, Večtomov died in Tábor. During his final year Večtomov had been placing finishing touches on an album of Prague String Duo archive recordings due for release in December 2015.

References

External links

Czech classical guitarists
Male guitarists
Czech music educators
Musicians from Prague
20th-century classical musicians
People from Veselí nad Lužnicí
1946 births
2015 deaths
Deaths in the Czech Republic
20th-century guitarists
Czech people of Russian descent